The Queen Street subway line was a proposed subway line for the city of Toronto, Ontario, Canada. It was one of many subway lines planned for, but has yet to be built by the Toronto Transit Commission.

History

1911 proposal

It began with a streetcar subway line proposal by the Department of Railways and Bridges of the City of Toronto Engineers in 1911, but it was not until the 1940s that the line re-emerged.

Post-World War II plans

The 1944 TTC Rapid Transit Proposals for a Queen Street route and a referendum on January 1, 1946, brought the Queen subway line back to life. The line called for an open-cut with right of way and built to the north of the existing Queen streetcar line.

The Yonge line was built first and subsequently, it was decided to build an east–west subway line along Bloor Street and Danforth Avenue instead of Queen due to changes in traffic and population patterns.

The existing Queen Street streetcar line is the longest and most heavily used. However, the volume of riders did not justify a subway line in the 1960s.

Stations
A rough platform, partial station is all that remains of a station and the proposed Queen subway line with access from a door from the existing Queen station.

Stations on the proposed Queen line:

 Trinity Park
 Bathurst
 Spadina
 Grange
 York
 City Hall
 Yonge (Lower Queen)
 Church
 Sherbourne
 Parliament
 Don
 Broadview
 Logan

Proposed routes
Later changes to the line would have extended the subway to the Humber Loop in the west and Eglinton-Don Mills to the north-east end:

 1960 - subway from Sunnyside to Greenwood, then from Greenwood to O'Connor Drive and connect with the Bloor-Danforth subway at either Greenwood or Donlands stations
 1964 - an underground streetcar line from Greenwood to McCaul to replace the existing surface route.
 1964 - a route was to have the underground section from Jarvis (Sherbourne in 1968 plan) to Spadina. The route re-surfaces between Spadina to Humber Loop and from Jarvis to either Broadview or Pape.
 1968 - Queen from Humber to Victoria Park
 1968 - Greenwood and O'Connor to Queen; Queen from Dufferin; Dufferin north to Weston rail corridor to Islington
 1968 - Greenwood and O'Connor to Queen; Queen from Dufferin; Dufferin north to Weston rail corridor to Eglinton; Eglinton to Martin Grove
 1968 - Greenwood and Danforth to Queen; Queen from Dufferin; Dufferin north to Weston rail corridor and Eglinton
 1972 - GO-Urban route using railway corridors - from Eglinton and Kennedy to Don Valley; Don Valley to Union; Union to Dundas West
 2016 - Yonge/City hall along Queen to Carlaw, then North to Pape Station, with potential for future northward extension
 2019 - Exhibition to Queen; Queen from Lakeshore rail corridor; Lakeshore rail corridor to Pape; Pape to Overlea; Overlea to Don Mills; Don Mills north to Science Centre Station 

The Queen route was not removed from plans until 1975, but a portion of Lower Queen station now contains an elevator shaft due to elevator construction in Queen station in the 1990s.

See also

Downtown Relief Line
Queen (TTC)
Toronto Transit Commission
Toronto Transportation Commission
Eglinton West subway
Ontario Line

References

Plans that reviewed and proposed the Queen line:

 Rapid Transit Subways - Department of Railways and Bridges of the City of Toronto Engineers  1911
 Rapid Transit for Toronto - TTC 1944
 Draft Official Plan of the Metropolitan Toronto Planning Area - Metropolitan Toronto Planning Board 1960
 Metropolitan Toronto Transportation Plan - Metropolitan Toronto Planning Board 1964
 Draft Official Plan for Metropolitan Toronto - Metropolitan Toronto Planning Board 1959
 Metropolitan Toronto and Region Transportation Study - mid-1960s
 Transit Facility in the Downtown section of Queen Street - TTC 1966
 Report on Rapid Transit Priorities in Metropolitan Toronto - Metropolitan Toronto Planning Board 1969
 A Concept for Integrated Rapid Transit and Commuter Rail Systems in Metropolitan Toronto - TTC 1969
 GO-Urban concept - Province of Ontario 1972
 Choices For The Future - Metropolitan Toronto Transportation Plan Review 1972

External links
 Downtown Relief Line
 DRL Now! - A website dedicated to promotion of the Downtown Relief Line

Abandoned rapid transit stations
Proposed Toronto rapid transit projects
Toronto streetcar system
Cancelled rapid transit lines and systems
Cancelled projects in Canada